Ramón or Ramon may refer to:

People

Given name
Ramon (footballer, born 1950), Brazilian footballer
Ramón (footballer, born 1983), Brazilian footballer
Ramón (footballer, born 1988), Brazilian footballer
Ramón (footballer, born 1990), Brazilian footballer
Ramon (footballer, born 1991), Brazilian footballer
Ramon (footballer, born 1995), Brazilian footballer
Ramon (footballer, born 1997), Brazilian footballer
Ramon (footballer, born 1998), Brazilian footballer
Ramon (footballer, born 2000), Brazilian footballer
Ramon (footballer, born 2001), Brazilian footballer
Ramón (singer), Spanish singer who represented Spain in the 2004 Eurovision Song Contest
Ramón Blanco y Erenas (1833–1906), Spanish brigadier and colonial administrator of the Philippines
Ramón Castillo (1873-1944), former Argentinian president
Ramon Dekkers, Dutch muay thai fighter
Ramón del Valle-Inclán (1866–1936), Spanish dramatist and novelist
Ramón Díaz, Argentine football player and coach
Ramón H. Dovalina (born 1943), American educator
Ramón Emeterio Betances (1827–1898), Puerto Rican nationalist
Ramón Arellano Félix (1964–2002), Mexican drug lord and fugitive
Ramón Fumadó (born 1981), Venezuelan diver
Ramón Fernando García (born 1972), Colombian road cyclist
Ramón Gerardo Antonio Estévez (born 1940), American actor, using the stage name Martin Sheen
Ramón González (athlete) (born 1966), Cuban javelin thrower
Ramón Gómez de la Serna (1888–1963), Spanish author and dramatist frequently abbreviated as Ramón
Ramon Goose (born 1977), a blues-rock guitarist, singer
Ramón Hernández (born 1976), Venezuelan baseball player for the Cincinnati Reds
Ramón Ibarra Banda (born 1956), Mexican professional wrestler better known as Super Parka and Volador
Ramón Ibarra Rivera (born 1981), Mexican professional wrestler better known as Volador Jr.
Ramón Jiménez Gaona (born 1969), Paraguayan discus thrower
Ramón Lamoneda (1892–1971), Spanish typographer and politician
Ramón Laureano (born 1994), Dominican Republic professional baseball player
Ramon Lopes de Freitas (born 1989), Brazilian footballer
Ramón López (disambiguation), multiple people
Ramón Magsaysay (1907–1957), third President of the Third Philippine Republic
Ramon Menezes (born 1972), Brazilian footballer
Ramón Mercader (1913-1978), Spanish Communist, assassinated Leon Trotsky
Ramón Novarro (1899–1968), Mexican actor who achieved fame as a "Latin lover" in silent films
Ramon Nomar (born 1974), Venezuelan born Spanish porn actor
Ramón Osni Moreira Lage (born 1988), Brazilian footballer
Ramon Puerta (born 1951), Argentinian politician
Ramón da Silva Ramos (born 1950), Brazilian footballer
Ramón Rodrigo de Freitas (born 1983), Brazilian footballer
Ramón Rodríguez (actor) (born 1979), American actor
Ramón Rosso (born 1996), Dominican Republic professional baseball player
Ramon Sessions, American professional basketball player
Ramón Soria (born 1989), Spanish footballer
Ramon Tikaram (born 1967), British actor
Ramon Tremosa (born 1965), Spanish politician
Ramón Troncoso (born 1983), Dominican baseball pitcher
Ramon Tulfo (born 1946), Filipino TV host, radio broadcaster, and columnist
Ramón Vinay (1911–1996), Chilean opera singer
Ramon Wilson (born 1934), English World Cup winning footballer
Ramón Luis Ayala Rodríguez (better known as Daddy Yankee), Puerto Rican Reggaeton pioneer

Surname
Anselmo Ramon (born 1988), Brazilian footballer
Charkey Ramon (born Dave Bruce Ballard in 1950), Australian boxer of the 1970s, and referee of the 1970s and 1980s
Einat Ramon (born 1959), first Israeli-born woman rabbi
Gaston Ramon (1886–1963), French veterinarian and biologist
Haim Ramon (born 1950), Israeli politician and former Minister of Justice
Ilan Ramon (1954–2003), Israeli Air Force pilot and only Israeli astronaut, killed in the 2003 Space Shuttle Columbia disaster
Juan Ramón (born 1940), Argentine singer
Miriam Ramón (born 1973), Ecuadorian racewalker
Steve Ramon (born 1979), Belgian motorcross racer

Fictional characters
Ramón, a character from the King of Fighters series
Don Ramón, a character from the television sitcom El Chavo del Ocho
General Ramon Esperanza, a character from the action-thriller Die Hard 2
Ramόn "Phantom Phreak" Sánchez, a character from the 1995 movie Hackers
A penguin character from the Happy Feet film series
The alligator in the 1980 film Alligator

Stage names
Razor Ramon, a character of professional wrestler Scott Hall
Masaki Sumitani, professional wrestler known as Razor Ramon HG

Localities
Ramon, Isabela, municipality in the Philippines
Ramon, Russia, an urban-type settlement in Voronezh Oblast, Russia
Ramon Crater, a large natural crater in the Israeli Negev desert

Other
Ramon Airport, Israel
Ramón tree, an alternative common name for the Breadnut tree (Brosimum alicastrum)

See also
Raymond
Ramone (disambiguation)

Spanish masculine given names
Spanish-language surnames